Sceptridium multifidum is a fern species in the Ophioglossaceae (Adder's tongue family), known by the common names leathery grapefern and leathery moonwort.

Distribution
It is native to Europe, Asia, and North America including Greenland, where it is widespread and grows in moist areas in many habitat types.

Description
This is a fleshy, leathery plant growing from a small caudex with thin, corky roots. Unlike most ferns, S. multifidum has contractile roots, which are thought to help anchor the plant in the soil. It produces a single leaf which emerges directly from the ground. It is divided into a sterile and a fertile part. The sterile part of the leaf is wide and has rounded or oval-shaped leaflets. The fertile part of the leaf is very different in shape, with grape-like clusters of sporangia by which it reproduces. The gametophytes develop from these spores in the soil, and are thought to associate with an endophytic fungus like the gametophytes of other members of this genus. While the gametophytes have not been observed in nature, they have been grown under lab conditions.

Rarity 
This species is rare in Europe. In Ukraine, there have been 86 recorded localities. In Greenland this species is considered Vulnerable.

References

External links
Jepson Manual Treatment
Flora of North America
Photo gallery

Ophioglossaceae
Ferns of the Americas
Ferns of Asia
Ferns of Europe
Ferns of California
Ferns of the United States
Flora of the West Coast of the United States
Flora of the Sierra Nevada (United States)
Flora of the Northwestern United States
Flora of the Western United States
Flora of the Northern United States
Flora of Canada
Flora of Finland
Flora of Russia
Flora of Greenland
Flora without expected TNC conservation status